Stenidea gertiana is a species of beetle in the family Cerambycidae. It was described by Sama in 1996, originally under the genus Deroplia. It is known from the Canary Islands. It feeds on Euphorbia balsamifera.

References

gertiana
Beetles described in 1996